Affairs of the Heart may refer to:

Literature 
 Affairs of the Heart (1900), a novel anthology by English author Violet Hunt
 Affairs of the Heart (1949), a 1949 book by English writer Malcolm Muggeridge
 Erotes ("Affairs of the Heart"), a Greek dialogue, attributed to Lucian, between the mythological characters Orestes and Pylades

Music 
 Affairs of the Heart, a record label used by band Flare Acoustic Arts League
 Affairs of the Heart, a short-lived early 1980s new wave synthpop trio in which Steve Street was a member
 Affairs of the Heart, a concerto composed by Marjan Mozetich that was released as a recording featuring violinist Juliette Kang by CBC Records in 2000
 Affairs of the Heart (album), a 1991 studio album by American pop singer Jody Watley
 Affairs of the Heart (2007), debut album of English singer-songwriter Sandy Green

Songs
 "Affairs of the Heart", second song from World Saxophone Quartet's 1979 album Revue
 "Affairs of the Heart", eleventh song from John Wesley Harding's 1990 album Here Comes the Groom
 "Affairs of the Heart", sixth song from Fleetwood Mac's 1990 album Behind the Mask
 "Affairs of the Heart", third song from Emerson, Lake & Palmer's 1992 album Black Moon
 "Affairs of the Heart", seventh song of Buju Banton's 2009 dancehall album Rasta Got Soul
 "Affairs of the Heart", a 2012 reggae single recorded by Damian Marley

Television 
 Affairs of the Heart (1974 TV series), a British TV series
 Affairs of the Heart (TV series), a 1985 English sitcom about how a man's life changes after he survives a heart attack
 Affairs of the Heart (2000), a British television documentary about infidelity, presented by psychologist Oliver James

Episodes
 "Affairs of the Heart" (1983), 22nd and final episode of the 10th season of American sitcom Happy Days
 "Affairs of the Heart" (1986), sixth episode of the second season of American sitcom Cheers
 "Affairs of the Heart" (1987), 39th and final episode of the first season of the Australian sitcom Hey Dad..!
 "Affairs of the Heart" (1997), twelfth episode of the seventh season of the British police drama Heartbeat
 "Affairs of the Heart", eighth episode of Philippene supernatural drama series E.S.P. (2008)
 "Affairs of the Heart", fifth episode of Estonian drama miniseries Tuulepealne maa (2008)

Film 
 Affairs of the Heart (film), a 2017 Nigerian film